Potters Village is a township located on Antigua in Antigua and Barbuda. It is located in the north of the island, to the east of the capital, St. John's and southwest of Piggotts.

The town has a Living Condition Index (unmet basic needs index) of 12.60 and an unemployment rate of 16.1.

Demographics 
Potters Village has five enumeration districts.

 32800 Potters-North 
 32900 Potters-Central 
 33000 Potters-East 
 33100 Potters-South 
 33200 Potters-Cemetery

Census Data

References

Scott, C. R. (ed.) (2005) Insight guide: Caribbean (5th edition). London: Apa Publications.

Populated places in Antigua and Barbuda
Saint John Parish, Antigua and Barbuda